Micropleurotoma travailleuri is a species of sea snail, a marine gastropod mollusk in the family Horaiclavidae.

Description
The length of the shell attains 10 mm.

Distribution
This marine species occurs in the Atlantic Ocean off Madeira at bathyal depths.

References

 Locard A., 1897–1898 : Expéditions scientifiques du Travailleur et du Talisman pendant les années 1880, 1881, 1882 et 1883. Mollusques testacés.; Paris, Masson vol. 1 [1897], p. 1-516 pl. 1–22 vol. 2 [1898], p. 517-1044 pl. 23–40
 Bouchet P. & Warén A. (1980). Revision of the North-East Atlantic bathyal and abyssal Turridae (Mollusca: Gastropoda). Journal of Molluscan Studies Suppl. 8: 1–119
 Gofas, S.; Le Renard, J.; Bouchet, P. (2001). Mollusca. in: Costello, M.J. et al. (eds), European Register of Marine Species: a check-list of the marine species in Europe and a bibliography of guides to their identification. Patrimoines Naturels. 50: 180–213

External links
  Tucker, J.K. 2004 Catalog of recent and fossil turrids (Mollusca: Gastropoda). Zootaxa 682:1–1295.
 Lectotype at MNHN, Paris
 Gofas, S.; Luque, Á. A.; Templado, J.; Salas, C. (2017). A national checklist of marine Mollusca in Spanish waters. Scientia Marina. 81(2) : 241–254

travailleuri
Gastropods described in 1980